Narimanovo is a rural locality (a selo) in Kalininsky Selsoviet of Volodarsky District, Astrakhan Oblast, Russia. The population was 123 as of 2010.

Geography
Kalinino is the nearest rural locality.

References

rural localities in Volodarsky District, Astrakhan Oblast